In mathematics, especially functional analysis, a Banach algebra, named after Stefan Banach, is an associative algebra  over the real or complex numbers (or over a non-Archimedean complete normed field) that at the same time is also a Banach space, that is, a normed space that is complete in the metric induced by the norm. The norm is required to satisfy

This ensures that the multiplication operation is continuous.

Often one assumes a priori that the algebra under consideration is unital: for one can develop much of the theory by considering  and then applying the outcome in the original algebra. However, this is not the case all the time. For example, one cannot define all the trigonometric functions in a Banach algebra without identity.

The theory of real Banach algebras can be very different from the theory of complex Banach algebras. For example, the spectrum of an element of a nontrivial complex Banach algebra can never be empty, whereas in a real Banach algebra it could be empty for some elements.

Banach algebras can also be defined over fields of -adic numbers. This is part of -adic analysis.

Examples

The complex conjugation being an involution,  is in fact a C*-algebra. More generally, every C*-algebra is a Banach algebra by definition.

 The set of real (or complex) numbers is a Banach algebra with norm given by the absolute value.
 The set of all real or complex -by- matrices becomes a unital Banach algebra if we equip it with a sub-multiplicative matrix norm.
 Take the Banach space  (or ) with norm  and define multiplication componentwise: 
 The quaternions form a 4-dimensional real Banach algebra, with the norm being given by the absolute value of quaternions.
 The algebra of all bounded real- or complex-valued functions defined on some set (with pointwise multiplication and the supremum norm) is a unital Banach algebra.
 The algebra of all bounded continuous real- or complex-valued functions on some locally compact space (again with pointwise operations and supremum norm) is a Banach algebra.
 The algebra of all continuous linear operators on a Banach space  (with functional composition as multiplication and the operator norm as norm) is a unital Banach algebra. It is without identity if 
 Natural Banach function algebra: A uniform algebra all of whose characters are evaluations at points of 
 C*-algebra: A Banach algebra that is a closed *-subalgebra of the algebra of bounded operators on some Hilbert space.
 Measure algebra: A Banach algebra consisting of all Radon measures on some locally compact group, where the product of two measures is given by convolution of measures.
 The algebra of the quaternions  is a real Banach algebra, but it is not a complex algebra (and hence not a complex Banach algebra) for the simple reason that the center of the quaternions is the real numbers, which cannot contain a copy of the complex numbers.
 An affinoid algebra is a certain kind of Banach algebra over a nonarchimedean field. Affinoid algebras are the basic building blocks in rigid analytic geometry.

Properties

Several elementary functions that are defined via power series may be defined in any unital Banach algebra; examples include the exponential function and the trigonometric functions, and more generally any entire function. (In particular, the exponential map can be used to define abstract index groups.) The formula for the geometric series remains valid in general unital Banach algebras. The binomial theorem also holds for two commuting elements of a Banach algebra.

The set of invertible elements in any unital Banach algebra is an open set, and the inversion operation on this set is continuous (and hence is a homeomorphism), so that it forms a topological group under multiplication.

If a Banach algebra has unit  then  cannot be a commutator; that is,   for any  This is because  and  have the same spectrum except possibly 

The various algebras of functions given in the examples above have very different properties from standard examples of algebras such as the reals. For example:

 Every real Banach algebra that is a division algebra is isomorphic to the reals, the complexes, or the quaternions. Hence, the only complex Banach algebra that is a division algebra is the complexes. (This is known as the Gelfand–Mazur theorem.)
 Every unital real Banach algebra with no zero divisors, and in which every principal ideal is closed, is isomorphic to the reals, the complexes, or the quaternions.
 Every commutative real unital Noetherian Banach algebra with no zero divisors is isomorphic to the real or complex numbers.
 Every commutative real unital Noetherian Banach algebra (possibly having zero divisors) is finite-dimensional.

Spectral theory

Unital Banach algebras over the complex field provide a general setting to develop spectral theory. Moreover, the spectrum  of an element  is non-empty and satisfies the spectral radius formula:

Given  the holomorphic functional calculus allows to define  for any function  holomorphic in a neighborhood of   Furthermore, the spectral mapping theorem holds:

When the Banach algebra  is the algebra  of bounded linear operators on a complex Banach space  (for example, the algebra of square matrices), the notion of the spectrum in  coincides with the usual one in operator theory. For  (with a compact Hausdorff space ), one sees that:

The norm of a normal element  of a C*-algebra coincides with its spectral radius.  This generalizes an analogous fact for normal operators.

Let  be a complex unital Banach algebra in which every non-zero element  is invertible (a division algebra).  For every  there is  such that

Ideals and characters

Moreover, the norm (that is, operator norm) of a character is one.

For any 

As an algebra, a unital commutative Banach algebra is semisimple (that is, its Jacobson radical is zero) if and only if its Gelfand representation has trivial kernel. An important example of such an algebra is a commutative C*-algebra.

Banach *-algebras

A Banach *-algebra  is a Banach algebra over the field of complex numbers, together with a map  that has the following properties:
  for all  (so the map is an involution).
  for all 
  for every  and every  here,  denotes the complex conjugate of 
  for all 

In other words, a Banach *-algebra is a Banach algebra over  that is also a *-algebra.

In most natural examples, one also has that the involution is isometric, that is, 

Some authors include this isometric property in the definition of a Banach *-algebra.

A Banach *-algebra satisfying  is a C*-algebra.

See also

Notes

References

 
 
 
 
 
 

 
Fourier analysis
Science and technology in Poland